Sandesh may refer to:

Sandesh (confectionery), a Bengali sweet prepared in Bangladesh and India
Sandesh (magazine), a children's magazine in West Bengal
Sandesh (Indian newspaper), a Gujarati newspaper 
Sandesh (Pakistani newspaper), a Sindhi language newspaper
Sandesh Assembly constituency, Bihar
Varun Sandesh (born 1989), Indian Telugu film actor